Interstate 205 (I-205) is an east–west auxiliary Interstate Highway in the San Joaquin Valley in Northern California. It runs from I-5 west to I-580. Along with those highways, I-205 forms the north side of a triangle around the city of Tracy. The route provides access from the San Francisco Bay Area to the northern San Joaquin Valley.

When I-205 opened in December 1970, it replaced 11th Street, which passed through downtown Tracy, as part of the primary all-land connection between the Bay Area and Sacramento until the Carquinez Bridge opened in 1927 and carried the Lincoln Highway and later US Route 50 (US 50). 11th Street is now signed as I-205 Business (I-205 Bus.).

Route description
I-205 begins at the bottom of I-580's eight-lane descent from Altamont Pass into the San Joaquin Valley. Here I-580 turns southeast to a junction with I-5, paralleling the California Aqueduct and Delta–Mendota Canal along the foothills, while I-205 continues east as a six-lane roadway, immediately crossing both waterways. The first interchange is with Mountain House Parkway, formerly Patterson Pass Road, which serves the planned community of Mountain House. Next is a split with I-205 Bus., a business loop that follows 11th Street through Tracy. As I-205 curves east-northeast and back east through the northern part of Tracy, it has interchanges with Grant Line Road (County Route J4 [CR J4] toward Antioch), Tracy Boulevard (CR J13 through downtown Tracy), and MacArthur Drive. After several miles without an interchange, the highway ends at a merge with I-5, where traffic can continue northeast to the junction with State Route 120 (SR 120) near Manteca and then east on SR 120 toward Yosemite National Park or north on I-5 toward Stockton.

As it connects to I-580, I-205 is a frequently-congested major commuter route to the Bay Area. Signs on eastbound I-580 instruct travelers to take I-205, SR 120, and SR 99 to reach Modesto instead of using the direct, but non-freeway, route SR 132. I-205 also serves to connect the Bay Area with popular weekend destinations such as Yosemite National Park, Reno, and Lake Tahoe. The Altamont Corridor Express provides commuters with an alternate route over Altamont Pass to San Jose and San Francisco, the latter through a transfer to Bay Area Rapid Transit.

I-205 is part of the California Freeway and Expressway System and is part of the National Highway System, a network of highways that are considered essential to the country's economy, defense, and mobility by the Federal Highway Administration. It is officially designated as the Robert T. Monagan Freeway after the California legislator who represented the area from 1961 to 1973.

History
When the Department of Engineering laid out the initial state highway system after the state's voters approved a bond issue to pay for it in 1910, they included Route 5, connecting Santa Cruz and Oakland with Stockton via Altamont Pass. San Joaquin County paved the portion near Tracy with asphalt with their own bond issue, passed in 1909, and the state later resurfaced it with concrete. In addition, the new concrete road bypassed Banta, which the old county road had passed through via Banta Road, F Street, and Grant Line Road. Otherwise, the road was relatively direct, coming down from Altamont Pass onto Grant Line Road, following Byron Highway into Tracy and leaving east and northeasterly on 11th Street to the San Joaquin River at the Mossdale Crossing. The Lincoln Highway Association chose this route in 1913 for their transcontinental highway, where it remained until the Carquinez Bridge opened in 1927, creating a shorter route via Vallejo. In 1926, the American Association of State Highway Officials designated the Stockton–Bay Area route as US 48, which was absorbed by an extension of US 50 by the early 1930s.

A 1938 four-lane bypass of the old road around Altamont Pass was extended east to Tracy as a four-lane expressway on November 16, 1954. By then, the entire route between the Bay Area and Stockton was four or more lanes, following the present I-580 (eastbound lanes where they separate), I-205, 11th Street, and I-5 from Livermore through Tracy to Stockton. During early planning for the Interstate Highway System, the main north–south route through California (now I-5) was to use SR 99 through the San Joaquin Valley; a connection to the Bay Area split near Modesto and roughly followed US 50. The Bureau of Public Roads approved a move to the proposed Westside Freeway in May 1957, and, in November, they added a North Tracy Bypass that would connect I-5 and I-580. Construction began in the late 1960s, incorporating part of the 1954 expressway and a new alignment bypassing Tracy to the north, and the $14-million (equivalent to $ in ) road opened to traffic on December 21, 1970. (A short piece at the west end, including the bridge over the California Aqueduct, was upgraded several years earlier when I-580 and I-5 to the south were built.)

Since 1970, I-205 has seen few changes. The largest have been widening from four to six lanes west of I-205 Bus. in 1999 and converting two diamond interchanges to partial cloverleafs—Grant Line Road in about 1997 and Mountain House Parkway in 2007 (including ramp meters). As of mid-2009, I-205 has been widened to six lanes (three in each direction) for its entire route. Also, the 1970s concrete pavement has been resurfaced with fresh asphalt from the junction of I-5 to due east of the 11th street connector ramp.

Future
The California Department of Transportation (Caltrans) has plans to improve merging distances by constructing auxiliary lanes between the interchanges and to add new interchanges at Lammers Road and Paradise Road. Caltrans is also planning to add one high-occupancy vehicle (HOV) lane in each direction between I-580 and I-5.

Exit list

Tracy business loop

Interstate 205 Business (I-205 Bus.) is a locally maintained business route. It locally follows 11th Street, the historic four-lane alignment of US 50, through Tracy. The route begins at a split with I-205 west of the city. After passing through downtown Tracy, it curves northeast at a junction with former SR 33, which has been truncated to the south at I-5. The final stretch of I-205 Bus. runs diagonally to a merge with I-5, which comes from the south and continues northeast along the former US 50 alignment.

See also

References

External links

California @ AARoads.com – Interstate 205
Caltrans: Route 205 highway conditions
California Highways: I-205

05-2
Roads in Alameda County, California
Roads in San Joaquin County, California
2 California
2 California
Lincoln Highway
205
05-2 California